This is a list of finalists for the 1995 Archibald Prize for portraiture (listed is Artist – Title).

Prize winners
The winners of the 1995 Archibald Prizes were:
 William Robinson – Self Portrait With Stunned Mullet (Winner: Archibald Prize 1995)
 Danelle Bergstrom – Jon English (Winner: Packing Room Prize 1995) (Image) (Note that the winner of the Packing Room Prize was not a finalist.)
 Josonia Palaitis – Bill Leak (Winner: People's Choice Award)

Finalists
The finalists were:
 Judy Cassab – Charles Blackman
 Kevin Connor – Self-portrait
 Fred Cress – Self-portrait
    John Dent – Portrait of Michael Blanche
    John Edwards – Me, myself, I 1995
    Joe Furlonger – Self-portrait
 George Gittoes – General John Sanderson in Cambodia
    Robert Hannaford – Jarinyanu David Downs
    Robert Hannaford – Self-portrait
    Nicholas Harding – Portrait of Rex Irwin
    Ken Johnson – Edward Gilly
 Bill Leak – Graham Richardson
 Kerrie Lester – A Man and his music: Peter Weiss and the Australia Chamber Orchestra
    David Naseby – Les Murray
    Judith O'Conal – Amanda Garrett
 Josonia Palaitis – Bill Leak (Winner: People's Choice)
    Robert Pengilley – Maggie Shepherd at Home
 William Robinson – Self Portrait With Stunned Mullet (Winner: Archibald Prize 1995) (Image)
 Jenny Sages – Gene Sherman with Family, After Tillers, After Freud, After Watteau
 Wendy Sharpe – Self-portrait (artist menaced by cupids)
 Jiawei Shen – The artist couple: M Huang and F Yu (Image)
    Eric John Smith – Hendrik Kolenberg
    Ian Smith – Ray Hughes ignoring a Sydney view
 Rosemary Valadon – Power, Knowledge, Passion – Portrait of Blanche D'Alpuget
 Wes Walters – Leo Schofield
 Bryan Westwood – Self Portrait with Memories
 Salvatore Zofrea – The Brother-in-Law

See also
Previous year: List of Archibald Prize 1994 finalists
Next year: List of Archibald Prize 1996 finalists
List of Archibald Prize winners
Lists of Archibald Prize finalists

References

1995
Archibald Prize 1995
Archibald Prize 1995
1995 in art
Arch